Madhya Pradesh State Highway 39A (MP SH 39) is a branch line of MP SH-39) running from Thandla town till Kushalgarh at the Madhya Pradesh-Rajasthan border.

See also
List of state highways in Madhya Pradesh
Madhya Pradesh Road Development Corporation Limited

References

State Highways in Madhya Pradesh